Elísio dos Santos Teixeira (4 March 1922 – 17 August 1999), was a Brazilian professional footballer who has played for São Paulo FC as a forward. Teixeirinha won the Campeonato Paulista for 6 opportunities  playing alongside great players like Leonidas and Sastre, and scored 188 goals in 525 games, being the #4 scorer in the history of São Paulo Futebol Clube. He was called to defend Brazil national team at the 1946 South American Championship, however he did not entered in any matches.

Honours

São Paulo FC
Campeonato Paulista:
Champions (6): 1943, 1945, 1946, 1948, 1949, 1953
Taça Armando Arruda Pereira:
Champions: 1952

References

External links
Teixeirinha at playmakerstats.com (English version of ogol.com.br)

1922 births
1999 deaths
Association football forwards
Brazilian footballers
Brazil international footballers
São Paulo FC players
Footballers from São Paulo